Amadou Tidiane Diallo (born 21 June 1994) is a professional footballer who plays as a midfielder for Romanian club CS Mioveni. Born in France, Diallo has represented Guinea internationally.

Club career
In January 2018, Diallo joined Championnat National side Red Star F.C. On 27 July 2018, the first matchday of the 2018–19 season, Diallo made his Ligue 2 debut with Red Star in a 2–1 home defeat to Niort. 

On 27 June 2019, he joined Azerbaijan Premier League club Sabah on a two-year contract. After his contract with Sabah expired, he moved to Czech First League side Teplice in September 2021. On 13 January 2022, he signed a two-year contract with Norwegian Eliteserien club Jerv.

International career
Born in France, Diallo is of Guinean descent. He represented the Guinea U20 national team at the 2016 Toulon Tournament. He has also represented the Guinea U23 national team.

Honours

RWS Bruxelles
Belgian Second Division: 2015–16

Red Star
Championnat National: 2017–18

References

External links
 

Living people
1994 births
Footballers from Paris
Guinean footballers
Guinea under-20 international footballers
French footballers
French sportspeople of Guinean descent
Association football forwards
Association football midfielders
Challenger Pro League players
Ligue 2 players
Championnat National players
Azerbaijan Premier League players
Eliteserien players
RWS Bruxelles players
Cercle Brugge K.S.V. players
Red Star F.C. players
Sabah FC (Azerbaijan) players
FK Teplice players
FK Jerv players
CS Mioveni players
Liga I players
French expatriate footballers
French expatriate sportspeople in Belgium
Expatriate footballers in Belgium
French expatriate sportspeople in Azerbaijan
Expatriate footballers in Azerbaijan
French expatriate sportspeople in the Czech Republic
Expatriate footballers in the Czech Republic
French expatriate sportspeople in Norway
Expatriate footballers in Norway
French expatriate sportspeople in Romania
Expatriate footballers in Romania
Black French sportspeople